The 2012 Tulsa Golden Hurricane football team represented the University of Tulsa in the 2012 NCAA Division I FBS football season. They were led by second-year head coach Bill Blankenship and played their home games at Skelly Field at H. A. Chapman Stadium. They were a member of the West Division of Conference USA (C-US). They finished the season 11–3, 7–1 C-USA to be West Division champions. They defeated UCF in the C-USA Championship Game to become C-USA champions. They were invited to the Liberty Bowl, where they defeated Iowa State to avenge a season-opening loss.

Schedule

Game summaries

at Iowa State

Tulane

Nicholls State

Fresno State

Last meeting was in the 2005 Liberty Bowl. This will be the first regular season meeting not as conference members as their meetings between 1999 and 2002 were as members of the Western Athletic Conference.

at UAB

at Marshall

UTEP

Rice

at Arkansas

Tulsa has lost the previous 17 meetings dating back to 1977.

at Houston

UCF

at SMU

UCF–C-USA Championship Game

vs. Iowa State–Liberty Bowl

This is the second time this season the Golden Hurricane and Cyclones will meet. The Cyclones won the season opener 38–23.

References

Tulsa
Tulsa Golden Hurricane football seasons
Conference USA football champion seasons
Liberty Bowl champion seasons
Tulsa Golden Hurricane football